Union Street is an east–west street in San Francisco. It starts out near the Embarcadero waterfront, with a half-block gap on Telegraph Hill before resuming near Montgomery Street, then runs through Russian Hill and a shopping district in Cow Hollow, ending in the Presidio. According to some, Union Street also marks the dividing line between Cow Hollow and Pacific Heights to the south.

It is the only east–west street that allows two-way traffic to traverse Russian Hill (all others have gaps or one-way segments).  The Muni 45 Union/Stockton and 41 Union bus lines, both utilizing Union Street, are the only Muni bus lines that cross Russian Hill east-west.

References 

Economy of San Francisco
North Beach, San Francisco
Russian Hill, San Francisco
Streets in San Francisco